José Diego Álvarez Álvarez (born 21 November 1954 in Monforte de Lemos, Lugo), known as José Diego, is a Spanish retired footballer who played as a defensive midfielder.

Club career
Even though he was born in Galicia, José Diego and his family moved to the Basque Country as he was still an infant, settling in Eibar. He started playing football for local Sociedad Deportiva, going on to appear in three Tercera División seasons with the team.

In summer 1974, José Diego was signed by neighbouring Real Sociedad, making his La Liga debut on 7 September (two months before his 20th birthday) in a 3–2 home win against FC Barcelona and finishing his first year with eight games. From the following campaign onwards he became a very important unit for the Txuriurdin, going on to contribute with 96 matches and seven goals in three seasons combined as they won the national championship in 1981 and 1982, adding the second position in 1980.

After only two appearances in 1984–85, José Diego retired from football at the age of 30. He played in 349 official games for his main club, scoring 23 goals.

International career
José Diego earned one cap for the Spain national team, playing the second half of a 0–2 friendly loss with England at the Camp Nou, on 26 March 1980. He was picked for the squad that participated in that year's UEFA European Championship.

Honours
Real Sociedad
La Liga: 1980–81, 1981–82
Supercopa de España: 1982

References

External links
 
 

1954 births
Living people
People from Monforte de Lemos
Sportspeople from the Province of Lugo
Spanish footballers
Footballers from Galicia (Spain)
Association football midfielders
La Liga players
Tercera División players
SD Eibar footballers
Real Sociedad footballers
Spain under-23 international footballers
Spain B international footballers
Spain international footballers
UEFA Euro 1980 players
Footballers from Eibar
Basque Country international footballers